Ernie Smith is the name of:

 Ernie Smith (baseball, born 1899) (1899–1973), American baseball player
 Ernie Smith (baseball, born 1931) (1931–2012), American Negro league baseball player
 Ernie Smith (tackle) (1909–1985), American football player
 Ernie Smith (American football coach) (born ?), American football coach in 1950s
 Ernie Smith (footballer) (1912–1996), English professional footballer
 Ernie Smith (singer) (born 1945), Jamaican reggae singer
 Ernie Smith (politician), Jamaican politician

See also
 Ernest Smith (disambiguation)
 List of people with surname Smith